Conflicts in the Horn of Africa have been occurring since the 17th century BCE. The Horn of Africa includes the nations of Djibouti, Eritrea, Ethiopia, and Somalia and the de facto independent nation of Somaliland.

Ancient
 Invasion of Ancient Egypt by the Kingdom of Kush and the Land of Punt (17th century BC).

Medieval and Early Modern
 Ifat's conquest of Makhzumi ( 1285)
 Conquests of Emperor Amda Seyon I (1314–1344)
 Abyssinian-Adal War (1529–1559), between the Ethiopian Empire and the Adal Sultanate
 Gobroon–Bardera War (late 18th century) 
 Egyptian-Ethiopian war (1874–1876) 
First Italo-Ethiopian War (1895–1896), between the Kingdom of Italy and the Ethiopian Empire
Italo-Ethiopian War of 1887–1889
between the Kingdom of Italy and the Ethiopian Empire
Military conflict broke out between Ethiopians and Sudanese in the 1850s

Early 20th century
 Dervish revolt against the United Kingdom (1899–1920), the Kingdom of Italy, the Ethiopian Empire, and other Somalis
 1922 Burao Tax Revolt (1922) between Habr Yunis tribesmen and the United Kingdom
 Second Italo-Ethiopian War (1935–1936) between the Kingdom of Italy and the Ethiopian Empire
 World War II
 East African Campaign (World War II) (1940–1941), between the Kingdom of Italy and the United Kingdom, the Commonwealth of Nations, the Kingdom of Belgium, and the Ethiopian Empire.
Italian guerrilla war in Ethiopia (1941-1943) An Italian Gurrilea Movement led by Eritean Independent movements and Italian Colonial Soldeirs that evaded capture after the surrender of the local colonial administration.
 1945 Sheikh Bashir Rebellion (1945) between Habr Je'lo tribesmen and the United Kingdom

Cold War

 Eritrean War of Independence (1961–1991), between Eritrean liberation fronts (primarily the EPLF and early on also the ELF) and the Ethiopian Empire (1961–1974) and Marxist Derg-ruled Ethiopia (1974–1991)
 1961 revolt in Somalia
 Somali–Kenyan conflict (from 1963)
 Shifta War (1963–1967), separatist insurgency by ethnic Somalis in Kenya
 Ethiopian Civil War (1974–1991), between the Derg (ruling government of Ethiopia) and various rebel groups, as well as amongst the rebel groups, including the Marxist Ethiopian EPRP, MEISON, and TPLF, the Eritrean EPLF, ELF, the monarchist EDU (in the first stage of the war), and the Somali WSLF; included Red Terror
 Oromo conflict (from 1973)
 Ogaden War (1977–1978), between Ethiopia and Somalia
Somaliland War of Independence (1981-1991), between the Somali National Movement and Somalia
 Ethiopian-Somali Border War (1982)

Post-Cold War
 Somali Civil War (1978–present)
 Djiboutian Civil War (October 1991 – December 1994)
 Hanish Islands conflict, (1995), between Yemen and Eritrea over the island of Greater Hanish in the Red Sea
 Second Afar insurgency (1995–2018)
 Insurgency in Ogaden (1995–2018)
 Ogaden conflict (2007), between Ethiopia and the ONLF
 Eritrean–Ethiopian War (6 May 1998 – 25 May 2000)
Puntland-Somaliland dispute (1998-ongoing)
 Djiboutian–Eritrean border conflict (10–13 June 2008)
 Gedeo– Guji clashes (1995 - July 2018)
 Oromo–Somali clashes (December 2016 - August 2018)
 Ethiopian civil conflict ( April 2018 – ongoing)
 Oromo conflict (1973 - ongoing)
 OLA insurgency (August 2018 - ongoing)
 Tigray War (November 2020 - November 2022)
 Metekel conflict (June 2019 - October 2022)
 Afar–Somali clashes (from October 2020)

See also
 Political history of Eastern Africa (for ancient, medieval, and early modern conflicts)
 History of Djibouti
 History of Eritrea
 History of Ethiopia
 History of Somalia

References

 Horn of Africa Concerns from the Dean Peter Krogh Foreign Affairs Digital Archives

Wars involving Ethiopia
Wars involving Eritrea
Wars of independence
War on terror
Civil wars involving the states and peoples of Africa
Civil wars post-1945
Cold War in Africa
Separatist rebellion-based civil wars
Africa-related lists
Cold War conflicts
Wars involving Djibouti
Wars involving Somalia